Low Hauxley is a small village in Northumberland, in the former Alnwick district, less than  from Amble and around  from Newcastle-upon-Tyne. It is combined with High Hauxley to make the civil parish of Hauxley.

Near the village is an important archaeological site, with an early Bronze Age cemetery as well as Mesolithic and Iron Age remains, but with much erosion. A major rescue dig was mounted for 13 weeks, between June and September 2013. Results were broadcast on Channel 4's Time Team special on 2 March 2014. According to a Hauxley parish council information board, flint tools dating to around 6500 BC have been found in local fields sand dunes and burial sites but later material may have been destroyed by mining.

References

http://www.archaeologicalresearchservices.com/projects/low-hauxley

Villages in Northumberland